Tenpenny may refer to:

People
 Chase Tenpenny (born 1991), American football player
 Mitchell Tenpenny (born 1989), American country music singer and songwriter
 Sherri Tenpenny, American anti-vaccinationist

Others
 Nail (fastener)
 Frank Tenpenny, character in Grand Theft Auto: San Andreas

See also
Twopenny (disambiguation)
Fivepenny (disambiguation)